Vlad Nicolae Mitrea (born 23 January 2001) is a Romanian professional footballer who plays as a midfielder.

Career
Mitrea spent his junior years at Dinamo București and Internazionale. At age 18, he joined the senior team of Belgian First Division B side Lokeren, but the club went bankrupt during his first season there and he did not manage to make an appearance.

References

External links
 
 

2001 births
Living people
Romanian footballers
Footballers from Bucharest
Association football midfielders
Liga I players
Liga II players
Sepsi OSK Sfântu Gheorghe players
FC Petrolul Ploiești players
CS Mioveni players
Romania youth international footballers